This is a list of episodes from the anime series Mobile Suit Gundam AGE. The series premiered on October 9, 2011 on the terrestrial MBS and TBS networks, occupying the networks' noted Sunday 5:00 p.m. schedule.

The story of this installment of the Gundam meta-series is divided into four arcs. Each of the first three arcs focus on one among three different protagonists who are members of the same family (a father, his son and his grandson), each one piloting his own version of the eponymous mecha during an interplanetary conflict that spans a whole century. The second arc is set between episodes 16 and 28, with "sharp#" by Negoto as its opening song, and "My World" by SPYAIR as its ending song. The third arc is set between episodes 29 and 39 with "Real" by ViViD as its opening song, and "WHITE Justice" by Faylan as its ending song. A fourth and final arc focusing on all three protagonists at once is set between episodes 40 and 49 with "AURORA" by Aoi Eir as its opening song, and "Forget-me-not ~Wasurenagusa~" by FLOWER as its ending song.

Arc 1: Flit

Arc 2: Asemu

Arc 3: Kio

Arc 4: Three Generations

References
General
 http://www.gundam-age.net/

Specific

Mobile Suit Gundam AGE
AGE